Television was introduced in Finland in 1955. Color television started in 1969 and was introduced gradually, with most programs in color by the late 1970s. All terrestrial analogue stations stopped broadcasting on 1 September 2007 after the introduction of digital television; cable providers were allowed to continue analog broadcasting in their networks until 1 March 2008.

Typically, foreign-language content is subtitled, retaining the original language soundtrack.  This includes interview responses in news or magazine programmes not given in the main language of that programme.  Foreign programming intended for children is, however, usually dubbed into one of the national languages. Regardless of the intended audience or original language, many shows receive a Finnish and/or Swedish title which is used in programme schedules.

In 2016 it was said that 47% of people watch via terrestrial antenna, 43% via cable, 11% via IPTV and 4% via satellite.

History 

On 24 May 1955, the first public television broadcast in Finland was aired by the Radioinsinööriseura (later Elektroniikkainsinöörien seura). The project eventually developed into TES-TV (later Tesvisio), the first television channel in Finland that began regular broadcasts on 21 March 1956. The public broadcaster Yleisradio began their television project in 1957, with regular broadcasts starting from 1 January 1958. Suomen Televisio (now Yle TV1), as the channel was called, also featured commercial programming from MTV, a separate channel that leased programming blocks from Yleisradio. This arrangement would last until 1993.

Yleisradio acquired Tesvisio in 1964 and reorganized its assets into a second TV channel (now Yle TV2). Despite MTV's demands that the second channel be in their control, Yleisradio maintained ownership of the second channel but sold MTV more time on it. In 1986, a third channel Kolmoskanava was introduced as a joint venture between Yleisradio, MTV and Nokia. MTV gradually purchased Kolmoskanava into their ownership and in 1993, turned it into MTV3. Once MTV3 was introduced, MTV moved all of its programming there.

Finnish programming

MTV3 

 Bosch
 Broadchurch
 CSI: Crime Scene Investigation
 CSI: Miami
 CSI: NY
 Crisis
 Emmerdale
 Hostages
 Legends
 Madam Secretary
 Major Crimes
 NCIS: New Orleans
 Prison Break
 Survivor
 The Amazing Race
 The Apprentice
 The Bold and the Beautiful
 The Closer
 The Mentalist
 The Night Manager
 Wallander
 24

Diva Channel 
 Army Wives
 The Biggest Loser: Toinen mahdollisuus
 Chicago Fire
 Bates Motel
 Bones
 Kallista kipua
 Sex and the City – Sinkkuelämää
 Chance
 West Wing
 Revolution
 C.S.I.
 Num3rot
 Gossip Girl
 Kuuntelija
 Nurse Jackie
 Smash
 Dexter
 Nuoret poliisit
 Yli synkän virran
 Burn Notice
 The Real Housewives franchise
 Rikoksista pahin 
 Wild at Heart
 Medium
 Psych
 Shattered
 Ruma Betty
 Kova laki: Erikoisyksikkö
 Kova laki
 Kova laki: Rikollinen mieli
 Kova laki: Los Angeles
 Mike & Molly
 Tyhjätaskut
 Orange Is the New Black
 Brooklyn 99
 Kunnian miehet
 Downton Abbey
 The Mindy Project
 C.S.I. Cyber
 Havaiji 5-0
 Tarkka-ampujat
 The Oprah Winfrey Show
 Good Wife
 House
 Muodon vuoksi
 Mad Love 
 Tuho-osasto
 Monk
 Vampyyripäiväkirjat
 Keeping Up with the Kardashians
 Eureka
 The Originals
 Isojen poikien leikit
 Event

Digital terrestrial 

Digital terrestrial television was launched on 21 August 2001. The analogue networks continued its broadcasts alongside the digital ones until 1 September 2007, when they were shut down nationwide.

Before the analogue switchoff, the terrestrial network had three multiplexes: MUX A, MUX B and MUX C. MUX A contained the channels of the public broadcaster Yleisradio and MUX B was shared between the two commercial broadcasters: MTV3 and Nelonen. MUX C contained channels of various other broadcasters. After the analogue closedown, a fourth multiplex named MUX E was launched.

In addition the free-to-air broadcasts, two companies are providing encryption cards for pay television: Canal Digital and PlusTV. Canal Digital was the first to launch, originally only offering four Canal+ channels (the Disney Channel was added later on). PlusTV was launched in November 2006, originally only broadcasting MTV3 Max and Subtv Juniori (later on adding Subtv Leffa and Urheilu+kanava). Both packages got more channels with the launch of MUX E in September 2007: SVT Europa and MTV3 Fakta was added to PlusTV and KinoTV was added to Canal Digital, while Discovery Channel, Eurosport, MTV Finland and Nickelodeon were added to both packages. 

September 2007 also saw the launch of the SveaTV package in Ostrobothnia which broadcasts channels from Sweden. 

The digital channel YLE Extra was closed on 31 December 2007 and was replaced by YLE TV1+, a simulcast of TV1 with subtitles included in the video stream. TV1+ was closed on 4 August 2008 due to its low viewing share.

Finland has started DVB-T2 switchover that will be finished on 31.3.2020.

Cable
Analogue cable television were switched off in Finland on 1 March 2008, but digital cable television is widespread all over the country and its infrastructure used for cable internet services.

The major cable operators are DNA, Welho and TTV, operating in Turku, Helsinki and Tampere areas. All pay television uses digital broadcasts, DVB-C set-top boxes have been available since 2001.

Satellite
Digital satellite television started in Nordic countries, and also in Finland, by Multichoice Nordic pay-TV platform during 1996. The first set-top boxes available were manufactured by Nokia and Pace. After that the service merged with Canal Digital in late 1997. Competing pay television Viasat and Yle's channel TV Finland started digital broadcasts in 1999. 

Canal Digital launched some HDTV channels, like Discovery HD, on their digital paytv-package during 2006. Pan-European HDTV-channel Euro1080 HD1 is available also in Finland.

List of channels 
All Yle channels are broadcast free-to-air and so are a few commercial ones including MTV3, Nelonen, MTV Sub, Jim, TV5, Star Channel and Kutonen. Yle channels are state owned and are funded by a ring fenced so-called "Yle tax".

Most of the channels are the same throughout mainland Finland. In Ostrobothnia and Åland there is an extra multiplex available which provides encrypted channels from Sweden, along with respective local stations, and of course due to overlapping signals, Russian, Swedish, Norwegian and Estonian stations are able to be seen near the border areas and vice versa.

DVB-T Channels

DVB-T2 channels

Viewing shares

Notes

See also
 Media of Finland

References

External links
 Viestinävirasto - Finnish Communications Regulatory Authority
 Digita - Terrestrial Broadcast Operator
 DNA - Terrestrial Broadcast Operator
 Finnpanel - Measures TV viewing and radio listening
Telkku.com - TV-guide